Edcouch-Elsa Independent School District is a public school district based in Edcouch, Texas (USA).

In addition to Edcouch, the district also serves the city of Elsa. The district serves high school students from Monte Alto.

In November 1968, the Mexican-American Youth Organization (MAYO) organized a boycott of schools. MAYO demanded, among other things, eradication of the no-Spanish-use rule and to introduce Mexican American course content. This boycott legitimized MAYO activism in South Texas. After the school expelled 62 students, the newly founded Mexican American Legal Defense Fund (MALDEF) filed a lawsuit for the school's action. In December the court demanded the school reinstate the students as political protest is protected by the Constitution.

In 2009, the school district was rated "academically acceptable" by the Texas Education Agency.

Schools

High Schools (Grades 9–12)
Edcouch-Elsa High School (grades 9–12)

Junior High School (Grades 7–8)
Carlos F. Truan Junior High

Middle School (Grade 6)
P.F.C. David Ybarra Middle School

Elementary Schools (Grades 1–5)
Santiago Garcia Elementary 
John F. Kennedy Elementary 
Lyndon B. Johnson Elementary 
Ruben C. Rodriguez Elementary

Early Childhood School (Grades PK–K)
Jorge R. Gutierrez Early Childhood

References

External links
 

School districts in Hidalgo County, Texas